The Fort Smith Council (September 21, 1865), also known as the Indian Council,  was a series of meetings held at Fort Smith, Arkansas from September 8–21, 1865, that were organized by the United States Commissioner of Indian Affairs, Dennis N. Cooley, for Indian tribes east of the Rockies (and particularly those living in what was then defined as Indian Territory).
 
Other members of Cooley's party representing the U. S. government were: Elijah Sells, Superintendent of Indian Affairs for the Southern Superintendency; William Harney, an  Army officer who had spent most of the Civil War in Europe; Ely Parker, a Seneca chief and U. S. Army officer who had been the military secretary for General Grant; Charles Mix,  secretary of the council and long-time chief clerk at the Bureau of Indian Affairs.

As president of the Treaty Commission, D. N. Cooley started the second day with his opening address. First, he reminded all present of the reasons for the meeting. The purpose was to discuss the future treaties and land allocations following the close of the American Civil War. Attendance was mandatory for all the tribes that had signed treaties with the Confederate States government—Creek, Choctaw, Chickasaw, Seminole, Cherokee, Shawnee, Delaware, Wichita, Comanche, Great Osage, Seneca, and Quapaw. The purpose was to notify them that, by taking up war against the United States, they had abrogated all their previous treaties and forfeited all their lands and annuities, and to discuss terms of the new treaties. He noted that Congress had already passed a law to that effect on July 5, 1862, forming the starting point for any new treaties. It was also to notify those tribes living in Indian Territory that some of their previous lands were to be turned over to the tribes who were being relocated from their reservations in Kansas.

Government stipulations
Cooley pointed out that the new treaties would be executed with individual tribes, and that each must address the following stipulations:
1. Each tribe must enter into a treaty for permanent peace and amity with themselves, each nation and tribe, and with the United States.

2. Those settled in the Indian territory must bind themselves, when called upon by the government, to aid in compelling the Indians of the plains to maintain peaceful relations with each other, with the Indians in the territory, and with the United States.

3. The institution of slavery, which has existed among several of the tribes, must be forthwith abolished, and measures taken for the unconditional emancipation of all persons held in bondage, and for their incorporation into the tribes on an equal footing with the original members, or suitably provided for.

4. A stipulation in the treaties that slavery, or involuntary servitude, shall never exist in the tribe or nation, except in punishment of crime.

5. A portion of the lands hitherto owned and occupied by you must be set apart for the friendly tribes in Kansas and elsewhere, on such terms as may be agreed upon by the parties and approved by government, or such as may be fixed by the government.

6. It is the policy of the government, unless other arrangement be made, that all the nations and tribes in the Indian territory be formed into one consolidated government after the plan proposed by the Senate of the United States, in a bill for organinzing the Indian territory.

7. No white person, except officers, agents, and employes of the government, or of any internal improvement authorized by the government, will be permitted to reside in the territory, unless formally incorporated with some tribes, according to the usages of the band. 

Several of these stipulations were new to the tribes, and caused much consternation and argument. They were already aware that the government planned to take part of their lands in the territory, and realized that they had no bargaining power on that point. They were prepared to make peace with each other (they had agreed to that in principle at the Camp Napoleon Council, which the government refused to recognize), and they knew, of course, about the outlawing of slavery. They were unprepared for the demand that the freed slaves (freedmen) be made full members of the tribe who had formerly owned them. And they were equally opposed to forming one consolidated government, which they recognized as dissolving tribal government outright, effectively extinguishing their identities.

Treaties of 1866
Before the Fort Smith council adjourned, it was agreed that the delegations would reconvene in Washington D. C. in early 1866 to complete their individual treaties with the government. 
 The Seminoles, whose obligations were straightforward, completed their work first, on March 21, 1866. 
 The Choctaws and Chickasaws confederated for the purposes of their treaty. They completed it on April 28, 1866. It was ratified with one amendment on June 28. The amendment was accepted by the government on July 2, and became effective July 10.
 The Creeks completed their treaty on June 14.
 The Cherokees came to terms on July 19, but the treaty was not proclaimed (put into effect) until August 14, 1866.

Notes

See also
Camp Napoleon Council
Indian Territory in the American Civil War
Reconstruction Treaties

References

External links

Fort Smith Council at Encyclopedia of Oklahoma History & Culture

History of Arkansas
Indian Territory in the American Civil War
Native Americans in the American Civil War
Pre-statehood history of Oklahoma
1865 conferences
1865 in Arkansas
September 1865 events